Hyères-Toulon Var Basket, also referred to as simply Hyères-Toulon or HTV, is a basketball club based in Hyères and Toulon, France.

Created by the merger of Omni Sport Hyerois and Club Sportif Toulonnais, the club shares its home games between the Espace 3000 in Hyères and the Palais des Sports in Toulon.

After several years in the LNB Pro A and LNB Pro B, the professional section of the club was dissolved in 2018.

History
Hyères-Toulon was promoted to the Pro A as the regular season champion of the 2015–16 LNB Pro B season. In the 2016–17 Pro A season, the club ended 15th in the standings which was enough to avoid relegation. In the 2017–18 season, HTV ended last in the standings with only 6 wins. This meant relegation back to the Pro B for the club. Because of financial problems, the club is forced to dissolve the professional section of the club. It sells its professional licence to newly established Paris Basketball.

Honours
LNB Pro B
Champions (1): 2015–16

Season by season

References

External links
Official site

Basketball teams in France
Sport in Var (department)